The Evacuation Creek Formation is a geologic formation in Utah, United States. It preserves fossils dating back to the Paleogene period.

See also

 List of fossiliferous stratigraphic units in Utah
 Paleontology in Utah

References
 

Paleogene geology of Utah